Antonythasan Jesuthasan (born 1967), also known by the pseudonym Shobasakthi, is a Sri Lankan Tamil author and actor.

Early life and family
Jesuthasan was born in 1967. He is originally from the village of Allaipiddy on the island of Velanaitivu in northern Sri Lanka. Appalled by the Black July anti-Tamil riots, Jesuthasan joined the militant Liberation Tigers of Tamil Eelam (LTTE) as a "helper" when he was around 15 or 16. He became a full-time member of the LTTE in 1984, receiving training locally and taking on the noms de guerre "Thasan" and "Buckle". A natural artist, Jesuthasan took part in the LTTE's 1985 street drama Vidduthalaikaali (Liberation Kali).

Jesuthasan became disillusioned with the LTTE and left the organisation in December 1986 for which he received the customary punishment. After the Indo-Lanka Accord was signed in July 1987 Jesuthasan moved to the capital Colombo. However, when war broke out between the LTTE and the Indian Peace Keeping Force, Jesuthasan was arrested in Colombo for being a LTTE member. He was released once the peace talks between the LTTE and the Premadasa government started.

In 1988 Jesuthasan, aged 19, travelled to Hong Kong, the only place he could go to without a visa. He stayed at the Chungking Mansions for six months before moving to Thailand with the help of the UNHCR, living as a refugee in a suburb of Bangkok. Unable to find fake British or Canadian passports, Jesuthasan, his brother and sister obtained fake French passports from a Frenchman and travelled to France in 1993 where they were granted political asylum.

In August 1990 the Sri Lanka Army invaded Allaipiddy as they tried to recapture Jaffna Fort. Around 85 youths were rounded up by the army and never heard of again. According to Jesuthasan amongst them were 23 of his relatives who were killed by the army and their bodies thrown into a well. Jesuthasan's parents fled by boat to Madras, India in 1990 after the Sri Lanka Navy took over Allaipiddy and turned it into a naval base.

Career
Jesuthasan had various low-paid jobs in Paris including stacking shelves in supermarkets, cooking, dish washing, street sweeping, hefting boxes around, construction work and working as a bellhop at Euro Disney. He became involved in left-wing politics, joining the Revolutionary Communist Organization of which he was a member for four years. He severed all connections with the LTTE and started campaigning, along with his leftist friends, against the Sri Lankan Civil War and the numerous atrocities and human rights abuses committed by the Sri Lankan government and the LTTE.

During his time in the Revolutionary Communist Organization, Jesuthasan's friends introduced him to literature. In the late 1990s Jesuthasan started writing, under the pseudonym Shobasakthi, short stories, plays, political essays and novels about his personal experiences during the civil war. His first novel Gorilla (2001) was based in his own experience as a child soldier in the LTTE. Gorilla was translated into English in 2008. His second novel Traitor (2003) was based on the 1983 massacre of political prisoners in Sri Lanka. Traitor was translated into English in 2010.

Jesuthasan's acting career started in 2011 when he wrote and starred in Sengadal (The Dead Sea), a film about Tamil fishermen struggling to make a living in the largely abandoned village of Dhanushkodi in southern India. The film was initially banned in India after the Chennai Regional Censor Board refused to rate the film. After a legal battle the film was given an "Adult" rating by the censor.

Jesuthasan starred in Dheepan, which won the Palme d'Or at the 2015 Cannes Film Festival, in 2015. The film tells the story of Dheepan (Jesuthasan), a former LTTE member, who claims political asylum in France by finding a woman and girl to pose as his wife and daughter. According to Jesuthasan the film was 50% autobiographical.

Despite the civil war having ended in May 2009 with the military defeat of the LTTE, Jesuthasan does not feel it's safe for him to return to Sri Lanka because of the continuing "armed attacks against minorities" and unknown fate of LTTE members taken prisoner by the Sri Lankan military.

When Jesuthasan traveled to Canada for the Toronto International Film Festival's screening of Dheepan, he was questioned about his past with the Tamil Tigers. He was allowed to attend the festival, but he said the authorities kept his travel document at the airport, handing it back only when he left.

Works

Translated works 
Gorilla (2008, Random House) (English translation by Anushiya Ramaswamy)
 Traitor (2010, Penguin) (English translation by Anushiya Ramaswamy)
 The MGR Murder Trail (2014, Penguin) (English translation by Anushiya Ramaswamy)

Filmography

References

External links

 
 
 

1967 births
French people of Sri Lankan Tamil descent
Liberation Tigers of Tamil Eelam members
Living people
People from Northern Province, Sri Lanka
Sri Lankan Tamil actors
Sri Lankan Tamil writers
Indian Peace Keeping Force